Garuda Indonesian Airways Flight 206 was a Garuda Indonesia flight that was hijacked on 28 March 1981, by the Komando Jihad in Indonesia. The McDonnell Douglas DC-9 plane PK-GNJ was hijacked on a domestic flight and forced to land at Don Mueang International Airport in Bangkok, Thailand. The hijackers demanded the release of their confederates from Indonesian jails and issued other demands. Three days later, the aircraft was stormed by Indonesian special forces. In the ensuing operation, all five hijackers were killed, while the pilot and one Kopassus operatives were mortally wounded, with both succumbing to their wounds later. All passengers were rescued.

Incident
The McDonnell Douglas DC-9, named Woyla, was scheduled to take off from Sultan Mahmud Badaruddin II Airport in Palembang, South Sumatra, on Saturday morning, 28 March 1981. The pilot was Captain Herman Rante. The plane departed Kemayoran Airport in Jakarta at 08:00 and was scheduled to arrive at Polonia International Airport in Medan, North Sumatra, at 10:55. After take-off, five men with revolvers stood up from their seats. Some pointed their guns at the pilot, while others patrolled the aisle, monitoring passengers. They demanded the pilot fly to Colombo, Sri Lanka, but the plane did not have enough fuel, so they refueled at Penang International Airport in Bayan Lepas, Malaysia. When they were refueling, the hijackers removed an old lady named Hulda Panjaitan from the plane because she kept crying. Subsequently, the plane took off and landed at Don Mueang Airport in Bangkok. Once there, the hijackers read out their demands. The primary demand was the release of 80 individuals recently imprisoned in Indonesia following the "Cicendo Event" two weeks earlier, where Islamists attacked a police station in the Cicendo sub-district of Bandung. The hijackers also demanded US$1.5 million, that Adam Malik be suspended from the post of Vice President of Indonesia, and that every Israeli be deported from Indonesia. They also specified the release of one of their comrades at a secret location. The hijackers told Thai police to deliver their demands to the Indonesian government, and threatened to blow up the plane with all the passengers and crew aboard if their demands were not met.

The Deputy Commander of the Armed Forces, Admiral Sudomo, immediately ordered the Indonesian Army's Kopassus, to conduct a counter-terrorist raid to rescue the hostages. The commandos borrowed a McDonnell Douglas from Garuda Indonesia that was similar to the hijacked plane for three days to rehearse a raid. The team was armed with new weapons, including Heckler & Koch MP5s. They set off for Thailand using a Garuda Indonesia McDonnell Douglas DC-10. On Monday, 31 March 1981, the team was ready, but the Thai government did not give permission for Indonesian forces to take over the aircraft as it was on Thai territory. In desperation, the Indonesian Strategic Intelligence Chief Benny Moerdani contacted a friend at the CIA station in Bangkok to persuade the Thai government to give permission.

The Thai government finally approved the raid with the assistance of the Royal Thai Air Force Security Force Regiment (SFR). On Tuesday, 31 March, the team began the hostage-rescue operation, dividing themselves into three groups: Red Team, Blue Team, and Green Team. The Red and Blue teams were to be at the plane's rear while the Green team was to enter from the back door of the plane. Members of the Thai SFR team were positioned on the tarmac in the event hijackers tried to escape. When the Kopassus team entered the plane, the hijackers were surprised and fired at the team, but three of the hijackers were killed when the team returned fire. One of the Kopassus commandos was shot, probably by his comrades, as was the pilot, also probably by Kopassus commandos. The rest of the hostages were released unharmed. Two of the hijackers surrendered to Thai commandos, but they were extrajudicially killed by the Kopassus commandos on the plane trip back to Jakarta.

Aftermath 
Achmad Kirang, the wounded Kopassus team member who was shot in the abdomen, died the following day on 1 April 1981 at Bhumibol Adulyadej Hospital in Bangkok. Captain Herman Rante, the plane's pilot who was shot in the crossfire, also died in Bangkok a few days later. Kirang and Rante's remains were transported from Bangkok to Jakarta, where they were both later interred in Kalibata Heroes Cemetery.

The entire Kopassus team, including leader Lieutenant Colonel Sintong Panjaitan, were awarded the Bintang Sakti by the Indonesian government and were promoted. Achmad Kirang was posthumously double promoted.

Garuda Indonesia continues to operate the flight number 206 as of January 2023, now serving the route between Jakarta and Yogyakarta, using a Boeing 737-800.

In popular culture
A film based on the incident was scheduled for production in 2014, but was cancelled.

See also
 Air France Flight 8969
 Singapore Airlines Flight 117

References

Further reading

External links
Komchad Luek Newspaper, International terrorism that has occurred in Thailand. (Thai version)

1981 in Indonesia
1981 in Thailand
Aircraft hijackings
Accidents and incidents involving the McDonnell Douglas DC-9
Aviation accidents and incidents in 1981
Aviation accidents and incidents in Indonesia
Aviation accidents and incidents in Thailand
Flight 206
Hostage taking in Indonesia
Hostage taking in Thailand
Terrorist incidents in Indonesia
March 1981 events in Asia
Islamic terrorism in Indonesia
Islamic terrorist incidents in the 1980s
Terrorist incidents in Indonesia in 1981
1981 murders in Asia
Murder in Indonesia
Murder in Thailand
Terrorist incidents in Thailand
1981 disasters in Indonesia